The Aquanator is a small-scale tidal-power device, a device which uses rows of hydrofoils to generate electricity from water currents.  It was invented by Australian inventor Michael Perry.

History
The Aquanator invention was announced in 2004. A contract to test the device was signed with Country Energy on 26 September 2004.

In beginning of 2006 it was connected to grid. However, the device test site was decommissioned in May 2008 by its owner Atlantis Resources.

Description 

The Aquanator used ocean current to produce electricity.  It was intended to generate power even with a small flow of 1.5 knots. The test device had a capacity of 5 kW. The aquanator’s slow moving hydrofoil design was meant to provide a green energy source which would not harm ocean life as faster moving turbines might.

Economy 
The aquanator was meant to be cheaper than diesel fuels, with costs about the same amount as wind power and will be one sixth the price of diesel-powered systems.

See also
Tidal power

References 

 "Could the ocean be used to power our cities?", Mark Vale, ABC South East NSW, 12 December  2003
 "Inventor taps into a new energy source", Philip Cornford, Sydney Morning Herald, 27 September 2004

Marine energy
Energy conversion
Renewable energy technology